"I'm Not a Player" is the debut single from rapper Big Pun (then known as Big Punisher), produced by Minnesota. The song peaked at number 57 of the Billboard Hot 100. "I'm Not a Player" helped the album become number one on the Billboard Top R&B/Hip-Hop Albums chart, selling more than one million copies in America.

Music video
The video, inspired by Scarface, features Big Pun buying a red Mercedes Benz and walking through a restaurant. Big Pun is seen dancing with ladies. Fat Joe, Noreaga, Cuban Link, Raekwon, Prodigy, Armageddon, Triple Seis, Prospect, The O'Jays (whose Darling Darling Baby was sampled in I'm Not A Player), and Angel Salazar make cameo appearances.

Charts

References

1997 debut singles
1997 songs
Big Pun songs
Songs written by Big Pun
Loud Records singles